Shahar Nakav (or Sahar, ; born 12 April 1997) is an Israeli footballer who plays as a defender and has appeared for the Israel women's national team.

Career
Nakav has been capped for the Israel national team, appearing for the team during the 2019 FIFA Women's World Cup qualifying cycle.

References

External links
 
 
 

1997 births
Living people
Footballers from Beersheba
Israeli women's footballers
Women's association football defenders
Ligat Nashim players
Israel women's international footballers
Jewish footballers
Jewish Israeli sportspeople
Jewish sportswomen